Olivia DeJonge (born 30 April 1998) is an Australian actress, known for playing Tara Swift / Shaneen Quigg in ABC1's Hiding, Becca in the film The Visit (2015), Elle in Netflix's The Society (2019), and Priscilla Presley in the American-Australian musical film Elvis (2022).

Early life 
DeJonge was born in 1998 in Melbourne, Victoria, the daughter of Robyn and Rob DeJonge, a businessman. She moved to Perth, Western Australia with her parents at the age of five, where she grew up in Peppermint Grove. She has studied at the Presbyterian Ladies' College, Perth.

Career 
In 2014, DeJonge made her feature film debut in the film The Sisterhood of Night; she starred along with Georgie Henley, Kara Hayward, and Kal Penn. Caryn Waechter directed the film, which was released on 10 April 2015, after getting a premiere in October 2014.

In 2015, DeJonge appeared in the Australian ABC's television drama series Hiding, on which she played one of the lead roles as Tara Swift / Shaneen Quigg. She played the co-lead role of Becca in the horror film The Visit, along with Ed Oxenbould. M. Night Shyamalan directed the film, which had its premiere on 31 August 2015, and was released on 11 September 2015 by Universal Pictures. In 2017, DeJonge starred as Alice Burbage in the TNT series, Will.

DeJonge played Priscilla Presley in Baz Luhrmann's 2022 Elvis Presley biopic Elvis. She drew praise from critics, who applauded her ability to match co-star Austin Butler's charisma.

Filmography

Film

Television

References

External links 
 

Living people
1998 births
Actresses from Melbourne
Australian people of Dutch descent
Actresses from Perth, Western Australia
Australian film actresses
Australian television actresses
Australian child actresses